Padial is a surname. Notable people with the surname include:

 Victoria Padial (born 1988), Spanish biathlete
 Carlo Padial (born 1977), Spanish comics artist, writer, screenwriter, and film director
 Luis Padial (1832–1879), Puerto Rican soldier